After  independence, Jawaharlal Nehru, the first prime minister of India, initiated reforms to promote higher education and science and technology in India. The Indian Institute of Technology (IIT)—conceived by a 22-member committee of scholars and entrepreneurs in order to promote technical education—was inaugurated on 18 August 1951 at Kharagpur in West Bengal by the minister of education Maulana Abul Kalam Azad. More IITs were soon opened in Bombay, Madras, Kanpur and Delhi as well in the late 1950s and early 1960s along with the regional RECs (now National Institutes of Technology (NIT). Beginning in the 1960s, close ties with the Soviet Union enabled the Indian Space Research Organisation to rapidly develop the Indian space program and advance nuclear power in India even after the first nuclear test explosion by India on 18 May 1974 at Pokhran.

India accounts for about 10% of all expenditure on research and development in Asia and the number of scientific publications grew by 45% over the five years to 2007. However, according to former Indian science and technology minister Kapil Sibal, India is lagging in science and technology compared to developed countries. India has only 140 researchers per 1,000,000 population, compared to 4,651 in the United States. India invested US$3.7 billion in science and technology in 2002–2003. For comparison, China invested about four times more than India, while the United States invested approximately 75 times more than India on science and technology.

While India has increased its output of scientific papers fourfold between 2000 and 2015 overtaking Russia and France in absolute number of papers per year, that rate has been exceeded by China and Brazil; Indian papers generate fewer cites than average, and relative to its population it has few scientists.

India was ranked 46th in the Global Innovation Index in 2021 and 40th in 2022.

History

1947–1967 

India aimed "to convert India's economy into that of a modern state and to fit her into the nuclear age and do it quickly." It was understood that India had not been at the forefront of the Industrial Revolution, and hence made an effort to promote higher education, and science and technology in India.

Planning Commission (1950) fixed investment levels, prescribed priorities, divided funds between agriculture and industry, and divided resources between the state and the federal governments. The enormous population rise, however, would balance the gains. The economically beleaguered country was nevertheless able to build a large scientific workforce, second in numbers only to that of the United States and the Soviet Union.

Education—provided by the government of India—was free and compulsory up to the Age of 14. More emphasis was paid to the enhancement of vocational and technical skills. J. P. Naik, member-secretary of the Indian Education Commission, commented on the educational policies of the time:

On 18 August 1951 the minister of education Maulana Abul Kalam Azad, inaugurated the Indian Institute of Technology at Kharagpur in West Bengal. Possibly modeled after the Massachusetts Institute of Technology these institutions were conceived by a 22-member committee of scholars and entrepreneurs under the chairmanship of N. R. Sarkar.

The Sino-Indian war (1962) came as a rude awakening to military preparedness. Military cooperation with the Soviet Union—partially aimed at developing advanced military technology—was pursued during subsequent years. The Defence Research and Development Organisation was formed in 1958.

Radio broadcasting was initiated in 1927 but became state responsibility only in 1930. In 1947 it was given the name All India Radio and since 1957 it has been called Akashvani. Limited duration of television programming began in 1959, and complete broadcasting followed in 1965.

The Indian Government acquired the EVS EM computers from the Soviet Union, which were used in large companies and research laboratories.

1967–1987 

The roots of nuclear power in India lie in the early acquisition of nuclear reactor technology from several western countries, particularly the American support for the Tarapur Atomic Power Station and Canada's CANDU reactors. The peaceful policies of Mohandas Karamchand Gandhi may have delayed the inception of nuclear technology in India.

Stanley Wolpert (2008) describes the measures taken by the Indian government to increase agricultural output:

The Indian space program received only financial support from the Soviet Union, which helped the Indian Space Research Organisation achieve aims such as establishing the Thumba Equatorial Rocket Launching Station, launching remote sensing satellites, developing India's first satellite—Aryabhatta, and sending astronauts into space. India sustained its nuclear program during the aftermath of Operation Smiling Buddha, the country's first nuclear tests.

Though the roots of the Steel Authority of India Ltd. lie in Hindustan Steel Private Limited (1954), the events leading up to the formation of the modern avatar are described below:

In 1981, the Indian Antarctic Programme was started when the first Indian expedition was flagged off for Antarctica from Goa. More missions were subsequently sent each year to India's base Dakshin Gangotri.

1987–present 

Indian agriculture benefited from the developments made in the field of biotechnology, for which a separate department was created in 1986 under the Ministry of Science and Technology. Both the Indian private sector and the government have invested in the medical and agricultural applications of biotechnology. Massive biotech parks were established in India while the government provided tax deduction for research and development under biotechnological firms.

The Indian economy underwent economic reforms in 1991, leading to a new era of globalisation and international economic integration. Economic growth of over 6% annually was seen between 1993 and 2002. Same year a new permanent Antarctic base Maitri was founded and remains in operation till date.

On 25 June 2002 India and the European Union agreed to bilateral cooperation in the field of science and technology. A joint EU-India group of scholars was formed on 23 November 2001 to further promote joint research and development. India holds Associate Member State status at CERN, while a joint India-EU Software Education and Development Centre is due at Bangalore. Certain scientists and activists, such as MIT systems scientist VA Shiva Ayyadurai, blame caste for holding back innovation and scientific research in India, making it difficult to sustain progress while regressive social organisation prevails. In addition, corruption and inefficiencies in the research sector and have resulted in corruption scandals and undermine innovation initiatives.

Bangalore is considered to be the technological capital of India. IT, biotechnology, aerospace, nuclear science, manufacturing technology, automobile engineering, chemical engineering, ship building, space science, electronics, computer science and other medical science related research and development are occurring on a large scale in the country.

In 2017, India became an associate member of European Organization for Nuclear Research.

India's science and technology policy 
The Government of India has passed four policy documents on science and technology:

 Science Policy Resolution 1958
 Technology Policy Statement 1983
 Science and Technology Policy 2003
 Science, Technology, and Innovation Policy 2013

The fifth policy, the National Science, Technology, and Innovation Policy, is in the draft and public consultation stage.

Space exploration

Mars Orbit Mission 

The Mars Orbiter Mission, also called "Mangalyaan", was launched on 5 November 2013 by the Indian Space Research Organisation (ISRO). It is India's first interplanetary mission, making ISRO the fourth space agency to reach Mars, after the Soviet space program, NASA, and the European Space Agency. The first Asian nation to reach Mars orbit and the first nation to do so on its first attempt was India.

Chandrayaan programme 

During its 25-minute descent, Chandra's Altitudinal Composition Explorer (CHACE) recorded evidence of water in 650 mass spectra readings gathered during this time. On 24 September 2009 Science journal reported that the Chandrayaan-1 had detected water ice on the Moon.

Chandrayaan-2 was launched on 22 July 2019. Over several months team tried to resume contact with lander, but ended up with no success. Later, by the late February 2020, it was claimed that an Indian software engineer from Chennai living in USA studied the NASA data of the proposed crashed site and found the Lander.

Chandrayaan-3 is a next planned mission of sending only the lander with rover inside on the Moon, with the Japan's JAXA. It was delayed due to COVID-19 pandemic

Gaganyaan 
Gaganyaan is a future planned, "in-development-process" space module to send the Indian astronauts into space, who are being trained in Russia. The plan is to establish a new "space-station" other than the ISS. India has kept itself from being part of the program, to show its "self reliance". The program was, too, delayed due to the pandemic of COVID-19.

Thirty Meter Telescope 

The Thirty Meter Telescope (TMT) is a planned, eighteen story, astronomical observatory and extremely large telescope to be built on the summit of Mauna Kea in the state of Hawaii. The TMT is designed for near-ultraviolet to mid-infrared (0.31 to 28 μm wavelengths) observations, featuring adaptive optics to assist in correcting image blur. The TMT will be at the highest altitude of all the proposed ELTs. The telescope has government-level support from several R&D spending nations: China, Japan, Canada and India.

Institutions and facilities

Science academies in India 
The idea of science academies in India has evolved along with the Indian independence movement. The three major science academies Indian National Science Academy, Indian Academy of Sciences and the National Academy of Sciences, India were all founded in the pre-independence era (pre-1947) between 1930 and 1935.

Indian Academy of Sciences

Also referred to colloquially as the "Bangalore Academy", Indian Academy of Sciences (IAS) was founded in 1934 by C. V. Raman, the eminent physicist of his time in Bangalore (now Bengaluru), Karnataka (formerly known as the State of Mysore), India.

National Academy of Sciences, India

The founder and first president of the National Academy of Sciences, India (NASI) was Meghnad Saha in 1930 in Allahabad (Prayag), Uttar Pradesh, India.

Indian National Science Academy

Founded in 1935 based on a proposal by the Indian Science Congress Association (ISCA) and National Institute of Science of India (NISI) with Meghnad Saha's blessings, Indian National Science Academy (INSA) is based in New Delhi, India. According to its charter, the historical aim of the INSA was to be similar to the Royal Society, London, a gathering of learned people to exchange ideas and further science.

Biosafety facilities in India

See also
 Biotechnology in India
 History of science and technology in the Indian subcontinent
 List of Indian inventions
 Communications in India
 History of Science and Technology in India
 Open access in India
 Science and Engineering Research Board
 Science and technology studies in India
Principal Scientific Adviser to the Government of India

References 
CitationsBibliography
 Alexander, Steve. E-Commerce. (2006: from Computers and Information Systems). Encyclopædia Britannica 2008.
 Desai, Ashok V. (2006). "Information and other Technology Development" in Encyclopedia of India (vol. 2), edited by Stanley Wolpert. 269–273. Thomson Gale: .
 Ketkar, Prafulla (2006). "European Union, Relations with (Science and technology)" in Encyclopedia of India (vol. 2), edited by Stanley Wolpert. 48–51. Thomson Gale: 
 Khan, Sultanat Aisha (2006). "Russia, relations with" in Encyclopedia of India (vol. 3), edited by Stanley Wolpert. 419–422. Thomson Gale: .
 Prabhu, Joseph (2006). "Institutions and Philosophies, Traditional and Modern" in Encyclopedia of India (vol. 2), edited by Stanley Wolpert. 23–27. Thomson Gale: 
 Raja, Rajendran (2006). "Nuclear weapons testing and development" in Encyclopedia of India (vol. 3), edited by Stanley Wolpert. 253–254. Thomson Gale: .
 Sankar, U.(2007). The Economics of India's Space Programme, Oxford University Press, New Delhi. .
 Sharma. Shalendra D.(2006). "Biotechnology Revolution" in Encyclopedia of India (vol. 1), edited by Stanley Wolpert. 154–157. Thomson Gale: .
 Sharma, Shalendra D. (2006). "Globalization" in Encyclopedia of India (vol. 2), edited by Stanley Wolpert. 146–149. Thomson Gale: 
 Schwartzberg, Joseph E. (2008). India. Encyclopædia Britannica.
 Vrat, Prem (2006). "Indian Institutes of Technology" in Encyclopedia of India (vol. 2), edited by Stanley Wolpert. 229–231. Thomson Gale: 
 Wolpert, Stanley (2008). India. Encyclopædia Britannica.

Further reading 
Policy

External links

 India: Science and technology. U.S. Library of Congress.
 Indian National Science Academy (2001). Pursuit and promotion of science: The Indian Experience. Indian National Science Academy.
 Special report: Physics in India, Matin Durrani, Physics World, 2012.
Where India Lagged? - Glimpse of India
 Relativistic Heavy Ion Collider  Indian contribution